Frauenstein is a town in the district of Mittelsachsen, in Saxony, Germany.

Frauenstein Castle is located northeast of the town centre.

Notable people

 Andreas Silbermann (1678-1734), born in Kleinbobritzsch, organ builder
 Gottfried Silbermann (1683-1753),  organ builder, born in Kleinbobritzsch, spent his childhood years in Frauenstein from 1686 onwards
 Thomas Schönlebe (born 1965), athlete and Olympian

References

External links 
 http://www.frauenstein-erzgebirge.de

 
Mittelsachsen